Abū Bakr Muḥammad ibn aṭ-Ṭayyib al-Bāqillānī (c. 950 - 5 June 1013), often known as al-Bāqillānī for short, was a famous Sunni scholar who specialized in theology, jurisprudence, logic and hadith who spent much of his life defending and strengthening the Ash'ari school of theology within Islam. An accomplished rhetorical stylist and orator, al-Baqillani was held in high regard by his contemporaries for his expertise in debating theological and jurisprudential issues. Al-Dhahabi called him "The Learned Imam, Incomparable Master, Foremost of the Scholars, Author of many books, The Example of Articulateness and Intelligence."

Biography
Born in Basra in 330 AH / 950 CE, he spent most of his life in Baghdad, and studied theology under two disciples of al-Ash'ari, Ibn Mujahid at-Ta'i and Abul-Hasan al-Bahili. He also studied jurisprudence under the Maliki scholars Abu 'Abdillah ash-Shirazi and Ibn Abi Zayd al-Qayrawani. After acquiring expertise in both Islamic theology and Maliki jurisprudence he expounding the teachings of the Ash'ari school, and taught Maliki jurisprudence in Baghdad. He held the office of chief Qadi in Baghdad and in 'Ukbara, a town not far from the capital. Al-Baqillani became a popular lecturer, and took part in debates with well-known scholars of the day. Al-Baqillani was a hadith scholar, having studied under prominent hadith scholars such as Abu Bakr ibn Malik Al-Qotaie, Abu Muhammad ibn Massi and others especially by Imam Al-Daraqutni, who was one of the leading scholars of Hadith at his time and who once kissed Baqillani's forehead (which is a sign of sincere respect) and said of him: “This is a man who will refute the allegations of people of false beliefs.”

Because of his debate skill, the Amir 'Adud ad-Dawlah dispatched him as an envoy to the Byzantine court in Constantinople and he debated Christian scholars in the presence of their king in 371/981.  He debated and defeated multiple Christian theologians on matters pertaining the differences between Islam and Christianity.

Creed
He supported the doctrine of the apologetic miracle being proof of prophecy, the non-creation of the Qur'an, intercession, and the possibility of seeing God.

Death
He died in 403 AH / 1013 CE. When Al-Baqillani died, the leading Imam of the Hanbalis who was Imam Baqillani's best friend of seven years, Imam Abu al-Fadl al-Tamimi, came barefoot to his funeral with many of his fellow Hanbali scholars and the funeral was packed with huge gatherings. Imam Al-Tamini was chosen as an announcer and he shouted:"This is the Helper of the Sunnah (of the prophet PBUH) and the Religion (of Almighty God)! This is the Imam (Leader) of Muslims! This is the Defender of the Sharia (Divine Law)! This is the one who authored 70 thousand pages (of Writings)!

Due to his prestige and high-esteem. He was buried near the grave of the famous Imam Ahmad ibn Hanbal and Baqillani's grave has become a place where thousands visit until today where they seek the blessings of Allah's mercy on him, and also pray for rain through his intercession.

Reception
Qadi Iyad said: "He is Known as the 'Sword of the Sunnah' and the 'Spokesman of the Community', who spoke the language of Hadith scholars, strictly keeping the firm to the beliefs (creed of Ahlu Sunnah), and was the head of the Maliki scholars of his time. His gatherings in Basra was huge."

Ibn Taimiyyah called al-Baqillani 'the best of the Ash'ari mutakallimun, unrivalled by any predecessor or successor'.

Al-Khatib al-Baghdadi: "Imam Baqillani nightly devotions and worship consisted of 40 cycles of Prayer (rakats) whether at home or while he was travelling away - after which he would write about 35 pages of textual Knowledge, after which he would pray Fajr Prayer, and then he would pass on his writings to others in circle (students and scholars) to read out loud for proof-readings, verifying and editing the texts."

Works
Fifty-five titles of works written by al-Baqillani have been listed, the great majority on legal and theological matters, and many written against his opponents.

 Al-Inṣāf fīmā Yajib I'tiqāduh
 I‘jāz al-Qur’ān (The Inimitability of the Qur'an)
 Al-Intiṣār lil-Qur’ān
 Al-Taqrīb wal-Irshād aṣ-Ṣaghīr
 Kitāb Tamhīd al-Awāʼil wa-Talkhīṣ ad-Dalāʼil (The Introduction)
 Manāqib al-A’immah al-Arba‘ah
 Fadl al-Jihad
 Hidayat al-Mustarshidin 
 Al-Ibana an Ibtal Muzhab Ahle al-Kufr wal-Dalala (Exposition of the Invalidity of the School of the Disbelief and Misguidance) Al-Istishhad Al-Kuffar wal-Muta'awwilin wa-Hukm al-Dar Al-Mulal wal-Nihal Al-Tabyin fi Adab al-Jidal Al-Tadil wal-Tajrih''

References

Source

External links
 Biography of Imâm Al Bâqillânî by Al Qâdî 'Iyâd Al Yahsubî
 Biography of Imâm Al Bâqillânî by Shaykh Jibrîl Al Haddâd 

Asharis
Malikis
Mujaddid
Sunni Muslim scholars of Islam
Sunni imams
People from Basra
10th-century Muslim scholars of Islam
10th-century jurists
11th-century jurists
10th-century Arabs
11th-century Arabs
940s births
1013 deaths
Year of birth uncertain